In physics, the acoustic wave equation governs the propagation of acoustic waves through a material medium resp. a standing wavefield.  The form of the equation is a second order partial differential equation.  The equation describes the evolution of acoustic pressure  or particle velocity u as a function of position x and time . A simplified (scalar) form of the equation describes acoustic waves in only one spatial dimension, while a more general form describes waves in three dimensions. Propagating waves in a pre-defined direction can also be calculated using first order one-way wave equation.   
  

For lossy media, more intricate models need to be applied in order to take into account frequency-dependent attenuation and phase speed. Such models include acoustic wave equations that incorporate fractional derivative terms, see also the acoustic attenuation article or the survey paper.

In one dimension

Equation 

The wave equation describing a standing wave field in one dimension (position ) is

where  is the acoustic pressure (the local deviation from the ambient pressure), and where  is the speed of sound.

Solution

Provided that the speed  is a constant, not dependent on frequency (the dispersionless case), then the most general solution is

This may be pictured as the superposition of two waveforms of arbitrary profile, one traveling up the x-axis and the other down the x-axis at the speed .

.

Derivation

The derivation of the wave equation involves three steps: derivation of the equation of state, the linearized one-dimensional continuity equation, and the linearized one-dimensional force equation.

The equation of state (ideal gas law)

In an adiabatic process, pressure P as a function of density  can be linearized to 

 

where C is some constant.  Breaking the pressure and density into their mean and total components and noting that :

.

The adiabatic bulk modulus for a fluid is defined as

which gives the result

.

Condensation, s, is defined as the change in density for a given ambient fluid density.

The linearized equation of state becomes

 where p is the acoustic pressure.

The continuity equation (conservation of mass) in one dimension is 

.

Where u is the flow velocity of the fluid.
Again the equation must be linearized and the variables split into mean and variable components.

Rearranging and noting that ambient density changes with neither time nor position and that the condensation multiplied by the velocity is a very small number:

Euler's Force equation (conservation of momentum) is the last needed component.  In one dimension the equation is:

,

where  represents the convective, substantial or material derivative, which is the derivative at a point moving along with the medium rather than at a fixed point.

Linearizing the variables:

.

Rearranging and neglecting small terms, the resultant equation becomes the linearized one-dimensional Euler Equation:

.

Taking the time derivative of the continuity equation and the spatial derivative of the force equation results in:

.

.

The final result is

where  is the speed of propagation.

In three dimensions

Equation 

Feynman provides a derivation of the wave equation for sound in three dimensions as

A similar looking wave equation but for the vector field particle velocity is given by
.

In some situations, it is more convenient to solve the wave equation for an abstract scalar field velocity potential which has the form 

and then derive the physical quantities particle velocity and acoustic pressure by the equations (or definition, in the case of particle velocity):
 ,
 .

Solution

The following solutions are obtained by separation of variables in different coordinate systems. They are phasor solutions, that is they have an implicit time-dependence factor of  where  is the angular frequency. The explicit time dependence is given by

Here  is the wave number.

Cartesian coordinates

 .

Cylindrical coordinates

 .

where the asymptotic approximations to the Hankel functions, when , are

.

Spherical coordinates

 .

Depending on the chosen Fourier convention, one of these represents an outward travelling wave and the other a nonphysical inward travelling wave.  The inward travelling solution wave is only nonphysical because of the singularity that occurs at r=0; inward travelling waves do exist.

See also 
 Acoustics
 Acoustic attenuation
 Acoustic theory
 Wave Equation
 One-Way Wave Equation
 Differential Equations
 Thermodynamics
 Fluid Dynamics
 Pressure
 Ideal Gas Law

References

Acoustic equations